Minden Miles (born May 22, 1996) is an American sport shooter. In 2019, she won the silver medal in the women's 10 metres air rifle event at the 2019 Pan American Games held in Lima, Peru. She also won the silver medal in the mixed 10 metres air rifle event together with Lucas Kozeniesky.

In 2018, she won three gold medals at the 2018 Shooting Championships of the Americas held in Guadalajara, Mexico.

References

External links 
 

Living people
1996 births
Place of birth missing (living people)
American female sport shooters
Pan American Games medalists in shooting
Pan American Games silver medalists for the United States
Medalists at the 2019 Pan American Games
Shooters at the 2019 Pan American Games
21st-century American women
20th-century American women